Gaurella, also known as Pendra road, is a Census town part of Gaurella-Pendra-Marwahi district in the state of Chhattisgarh, India.

Gaurella is the location of the Pendra Road railway station on Bilaspur -  Katni rail route of South East Central Railway, and is the  point on the s.e.c. railway. Height from sea level is 618.4 m. The station is nearest to Amarkantak, and Jwaleshwar Mahadev temple. To visit amarkantak alight Pendra road rly station.

The town is a destination for holy Tirth Amarkantak, and also a beautiful place to enjoy and place is a growing tourist centre in the region.

Climate

Gaurella's monsoon season takes place in July, August, and September.  However, the village experiences rain throughout the year, with February being the only month that is normally dry.

Demographics
As of the 2001 Indian census, Gaurella had a population of 15,173. Males constituted 51% of the population and females 49%. The average literacy rate in the village was 22%, substantially lower than the national average of 59.5%.  Male literacy was 29%, and female literacy 14%.

References

Cities and towns in Gaurella-Pendra-Marwahi district